Isiah Young (born January 5, 1990) is an American track and field athlete who competes in the sprints. He was selected to compete for the United States at the 2012 Summer Olympics in the 200-meter dash.

Born in Junction City, Kansas, he attended Junction City High School then Allen Community College, competing athletically for both institutions. Young also did weightlifting during his high school years. At the 2009 USATF Junior Olympics he won a sprint double in the 100-meter dash and the 200-meter dash. He enrolled at the University of Mississippi in 2010 and took part in collegiate competition with the Ole Miss Rebels. He missed the 2011 outdoor season, but in 2012 he won the 200 m at the Southeastern Conference meet with a school record of 20.32 seconds. At the Drake Relays, he won the 100 m and placed second only to Wallace Spearmon over 200 m. After this he came fourth in the 200 m at the NCAA Outdoor Championship.

He was disappointed with finished out of the top three at the NCAA meet and changed his focus to the 2012 United States Olympic Trials. He finished in third place in the 200 m with a wind-assisted time of 20.16 seconds. Having finished on the podium behind Spearmon and Maurice Mitchell, he guaranteed his selection for the 2012 London Olympics.  At London, he reached the semifinals.

On May 23, 2013 at the NCAA East Region Championships, Young joined the 10 second club running 100 meters in 9.99 with a +0.3 aiding wind.

At the 2013 USA Outdoor Track and Field Championships, Young qualified for the 2013 World Championships in Athletics by finishing second in the 200 meters. His time of 19.86 (+1.6 m/s wind) tied him with Donald Quarrie, Maurice Greene and Justin Gatlin for the 24th best performer of all time.

Statistics
Information from IAAF profile or Track & Field Results Reporting System unless otherwise noted.

Personal bests

Seasonal bests

International championship results

National championship results

Notes

References

External links

Living people
1990 births
American male sprinters
People from Junction City, Kansas
Track and field athletes from Kansas
Athletes (track and field) at the 2012 Summer Olympics
Olympic track and field athletes of the United States
World Athletics Championships athletes for the United States
USA Outdoor Track and Field Championships winners